Apotomis sauciana, the Sutherland long-cloak or Greville's marble, is a moth of the family Tortricidae. It is found in most of Europe, east to the eastern part of the Palearctic realm.

The wingspan is 13–16 mm. Adults are on wing from June to August. They fly during the afternoon and evening.

The larvae feed on Vaccinium myrtillus and Arctostaphylos species. They feed in spun shoots.

Subspecies
Apotomis sauciana sauciana
Apotomis sauciana grevillana (Scotland)

External links
UKmoths
Fauna Europaea

Tortricidae of Europe
Moths of Asia